The WRVA Building is an  building located at 200 N. 22nd St. in the historic Church Hill district of Richmond, Virginia. Designed by world-renowned architect Philip Johnson while he was at the architectural firm of Budina and Freeman, it was originally built to house WRVA (AM), one of Virginia's first broadcast radio stations. The building is considered "one of the city's most visible and important mid-20th-century architectural landmarks." ChildSavers, a Richmond nonprofit child services agency, is the current occupant.

Renovation
From 2007 until 2008, the WRVA Building underwent an extensive $5.4 Million renovation for use by ChildSavers. Baskervill, a Richmond architecture firm, treated the building with great care to successfully design its adaptive reuse. Very few structural changes were needed during its renovation.

References

External links
 http://www.mcgcva.com/default.htm
 https://web.archive.org/web/20050205084710/http://www.lva.lib.va.us/whoweare/exhibits/radio/voice.htm

Buildings and structures in Richmond, Virginia
Modernist architecture in Virginia